The Julius A. Coller House was the home of Julius A. Coller I, (1859–1940), born in Shakopee, Minnesota, United States, of German descent. He served as Scott County attorney, bank president, and state senator (1899–1914). He facilitated getting the Women's Reformatory located in Shakopee.

References

Houses in Scott County, Minnesota
Houses completed in 1887
Houses on the National Register of Historic Places in Minnesota
National Register of Historic Places in Scott County, Minnesota